The Hartland River is a perennial river of the East Gippsland catchment, located in the Australian state of Victoria.

Features and location
The Hartland River rises in a state forestry area on part of the Great Dividing Range and flows generally south by southeast before reaching its confluence with the Wombat Creek
The river descends  over its  course.

See also

 Rivers of Australia

References

External links
 
 

East Gippsland catchment
Rivers of Gippsland (region)